The 1939 Portsmouth South by-election was a parliamentary by-election held in the United Kingdom on 12 July 1939 for the House of Commons constituency of Portsmouth South, in Hampshire.

Previous MP

Previous Result

Candidates

Result 
Sir Jocelyn Morton Lucas was elected unopposed for the Conservative Party.

Aftermath 
In the 1945 general election, the Conservatives held the seat.

References
 British Parliamentary Election Results 1918-1949, compiled and edited by F.W.S. Craig (The Macmillan Press 1979)

1939 elections in the United Kingdom
1939 in England
Elections in Portsmouth
By-elections to the Parliament of the United Kingdom in Hampshire constituencies
Unopposed by-elections to the Parliament of the United Kingdom (need citation)
20th century in Hampshire